Maarten Willem Schakel (17 July 1917, Meerkerk – 13 November 1997, Gorinchem) was a Dutch politician.

1917 births
1997 deaths
Dutch resistance members
Mayors in South Holland
Members of the House of Representatives (Netherlands)
Christian Democratic Appeal politicians
Anti-Revolutionary Party politicians
People from Zederik